SEFE Securing Energy for Europe GmbH, a company registered in Berlin, Germany, is headquarters of a diversified conglomerate, comprises 40 entities operating in more than 20 countries in Europe, Asia and North America. Under the former name Gazprom Germania GmbH it was a 100% subsidiary of the world's largest natural gas company, Gazprom, from 1990 to 2022. Since 2022, Germany's federal energy regulator – the Bundesnetzagentur – has controlled the company as a temporary trustee.

General overview

Securing Energy for Europe is active in natural gas sales and marketing, trading, exploration and production, as well as in several large underground storage facilities, many formerly partially owned by Gazprom-Germania. Companies of the group operate in Europe, USA, Central Asia and Singapore.

Securing Energy for Europe owns shares in:
 Wingas (100%), with about 18% share of the gas market in Germany a joint venture between Securing Energy for Europe GmbH and Wintershall, the largest crude oil and natural gas producer in Germany.
 Vemex s.r.o. (51%), located in Prague, and controlling about 10-12% of the Czech gas market.  
 Gas Project Development Central Asia AG (50%).
 Wintershall Erdgas Handelshaus Zug AG (WIEH) (50%).
 ZMB (Schweiz) AG (100%)

Questions about activities
A U.S. Senate testimony by Roman Kupchinsky, (Roman Kupchinsky was the director of the Ukrainian Service of Radio Free Europe/Radio Liberty from 1989-2002. He is currently a partner in the risk analysis firm AZEast Group. He immigrated to Brooklyn, NY in 1949 from a refugee camp in Austria.) overseen by Sen. Joe Biden, noted:

German investigations have raised concerns about past connections between senior managers in the company, the East German government, and the Stasi.

European regulators (after the Russia-Ukraine gas dispute) insisted, foreign strategic energy supplies should operate under the EU law. Just as energies should be sold on the free market and not via direct contracts. Therefore Gazprom was forced to set up a net of companies (middlemen) operating under EU law.  During early 2022, Gazprom-associated gas storage facilities became unusually low. In late March 2022, Gazprom Group transferred ownership of Gazprom Germania which was then exited. The German authorities viewed the transfer as illegal for such critical infrastructure of the gas handling, and issued a legal order to control the assets of the former Gazprom Germania.

In May 2022, Russia issued sanctions against Gazprom Germania and other gas companies.

In August 2022, the German media learned that the German government had secretly created a company for the possible nationalization of SEFE. The company was originally called VERONIKA Zweiunddreizigste Vermögensverwaltungsgesellschaft, but on June 3, it was renamed Securing Energy for Europe Holding GmbH (SEEHG). The company's managing directors are two CMS Hasche Sigle lawyers. The Federal Ministry of Economic Affairs has confirmed that they are aware of the company's founding. According to a spokesman for the ministry, the company was created "solely as a precautionary measure".

On November 14, 2022, the Federal Ministry for Economic Affairs and Climate Action decreed that the company would immediately be nationalized and full ownership was transferred to the German state. This action was previously authorized by the European Commission.

Management
Before being appointed the new head of the former Gazprom Germania, Kotenev worked in the Russian foreign service. From 2004 to 2010 Kotenev was the Russian ambassador to Germany.

Since June 2022, Egbert Laege is the CEO (Senior Managing Director) of SEFE Securing Energy for Europe.

References

External links

Natural gas companies of Germany
Conglomerate companies of Germany
Multinational companies headquartered in Germany
Companies based in Berlin
Energy companies established in 1990
Non-renewable resource companies established in 1990
1990 establishments in Germany